Urii Mikhailovich Eliseev (July 29, 1996 – November 26, 2016) was a Russian chess player. He won the Under-16 section of World Youth Chess Championship in 2012 and was awarded the Grandmaster title by FIDE in 2013 at the age of 17. He won the Moscow Chess Championship in 2015 and the Moscow Open in 2016. He was ranked 212th in the world and 42nd in Russia, with an Elo rating of 2614.

Eliseev died in November 2016 at the age of 20 after falling from a balcony on the 12th floor of a Moscow apartment block. His death was reported by his friend and fellow Grandmaster Daniil Dubov, who said that Eliseev had been trying to climb from a window to the balcony but slipped. Eliseev's flatmate told Russian TV that the parkour enthusiast "loved extreme things" and had climbed between the window and the balcony before.

References

External links
Urii Eliseev chess games at 365Chess.com

1996 births
2016 deaths
Chess grandmasters
Russian chess players
World Youth Chess Champions
Accidental deaths from falls
Place of birth missing